Timoteo Tobias "Toby" Imada (born April 20, 1978) is a retired American mixed martial artist, grappler and kickboxer of Japanese and Mexican descent. A professional from 1998 until 2013, Imada competed for Bellator, King of the Cage, and the RFA. Imada won the 2009 Submission of the Year award for an inverted triangle choke, defeating Jorge Masvidal.

Mixed martial arts career

Bellator
In the first season Bellator Lightweight Tournament, Imada advanced to the finals after defeating Alonzo Martinez and Jorge Masvidal. The upset win over Masvidal was notable for Imada's bizarre inverse triangle choke while Masvidal was standing up. The submission has been acknowledged by many MMA mediums as the Submission of the Year for 2009. He was awarded a Bazzie award from Inside MMA on HDNet for the unorthodox submission victory and Submission of the Year Honors at the World MMA Awards.

At Bellator 12, Imada fought top five ranked Eddie Alvarez for the chance to become the first Bellator Lightweight Champion. Alvarez got the better of the battle and won the fight in the second round via rear-naked choke.

Imada returned to Bellator the following April, entering the Lightweight Tournament for the second time. His first fight was originally to be a rematch against Jorge Masvidal. He was then scheduled to fight against Ferrid Kheder at Bellator 15, but an injury forced Kheder out of the bout. Instead, at Bellator 14 Imada fought James Krause and won via armbar submission. With the win over Krause, Imada moved onto the semi-final round against Carey Vanier. In the second round after Vanier lost his footing, Imada capitalized and applied an armbar that caused Vanier to tap out.

Imada then moved on to the finals taking place at Bellator 22. There, Imada fought Pat Curran in the Season Two Lightweight Tournament finals to see who would advance to fight champion Eddie Alvarez. Curran defeated Imada via controversial split decision. Immediately following the decision, some in the crowd began booing. Bellator Lightweight Champion Eddie Alvarez weighed in on the decision, saying "It was a tough fight. It could’ve gone either way.”

Bellator again signed Imada for their Lightweight Tournament taking place during their fourth season. Imada had his quarterfinal fight at Bellator 36. He was originally set to fight Ferrid Kheder who was overweight and decided to leave the arena and not weigh-in. Imada instead fought replacement Josh Shockley. Imada won the fight in the first round after Shockley verbally submitted from Imada's reverse omaplata. The win moved Imada into the semifinals. In the semifinals Imada fought Brazilian jiu-jitsu black belt Patricky Freire at Bellator 39. He was knocked out at 2:53 of the first round with a flying knee followed by a left hook.

Imada has also fought professionally in kickboxing. In his most recent bout, he defeated Mostafa Abdollahi by majority decision (27–27, 29–27, 29–27) in a non-tournament bout at the Shoot Boxing World Tournament 2012 in Tokyo, Japan on November 17, 2012.

Championships and accomplishments

Mixed martial arts
Bellator Fighting Championships
Bellator Season One Lightweight Tournament Runner-Up
Bellator Season Two Lightweight Tournament Runner-Up
Total Combat
Total Combat Lightweight Championship (One time)
Neutral Grounds
Neutral Grounds 6 Four-Man Tournament Runner-Up
Neutral Grounds 13 Four-Man Tournament Runner-Up
World MMA Awards
2009 Submission of the Year vs. Jorge Masvidal at Bellator 5
Sherdog
2009 Submission of the Year vs. Jorge Masvidal on May 1
HDNet
2009 Bazzie Awards: Submission of the Year vs. Jorge Masvidal on May 1
FIGHT! Magazine
2009 Submission of the Year vs. Jorge Masvidal on May 1
Inside Fights
2009 Submission of the Year vs. Jorge Masvidal on May 1

Kickboxing
Shoot Boxing
Shoot Boxing World Tournament 2010 Runner-Up

Mixed martial arts record

|-
| Draw
| align=center| 30–18–1
| Hiroyuki Takaya
| Draw (majority)
| Shoot Boxing: Ground Zero Tokyo 2013
| 
| align=center| 3
| align=center| 5:00
| Tokyo, Japan
|Featherweight debut.
|-
| Loss
| align=center| 30–18
| James Krause
| Decision (unanimous)
| Resurrection Fighting Alliance 6
| 
| align=center| 3
| align=center| 5:00
| Kansas City, Missouri, United States
| 
|-
| Loss
| align=center| 30–17
| Luiz Firmino
| Decision (unanimous)
| CFA 08: Araujo vs. Bradley
| 
| align=center| 3
| align=center| 5:00
| Hollywood, Florida, United States
| 
|-
| Win
| align=center| 30–16
| Sean Wilson
| TKO (punches)
| C3 Fights: Rumble at Red Rock
| 
| align=center| 2
| align=center| 1:51
| Red Rock, Oklahoma, United States
| 
|-
| Loss
| align=center| 29–16
| Patricky Freire
| KO (flying knee & punches)
| Bellator 39
| 
| align=center| 1
| align=center| 2:53
| Newkirk, Oklahoma, United States
| 
|-
| Win
| align=center| 29–15
| Josh Shockley
| Submission (armbar)
| Bellator 36
| 
| align=center| 1
| align=center| 1:36
| Shreveport, Louisiana, United States
| 
|-
| Win
| align=center| 28–15
| Ludwing Salazar
| Submission (armbar)
| Fite Nite 14
| 
| align=center| 2
| align=center| 1:49
| San José, Costa Rica
| 
|-
| Loss
| align=center| 27–15
| Pat Curran
| Decision (split)
| Bellator 21
| 
| align=center| 3
| align=center| 5:00
| Hollywood, Florida, United States
| 
|-
| Win
| align=center| 27–14
| Carey Vanier
| Submission (armbar)
| Bellator 17
| 
| align=center| 2
| align=center| 3:33
| Boston, Massachusetts, United States
| 
|-
| Win
| align=center| 26–14
| James Krause
| Submission (armbar)
| Bellator 14
| 
| align=center| 2
| align=center| 2:44
| Chicago, Illinois, United States
| 
|-
| Win
| align=center| 25–14
| Daisuke Hanazawa
| KO (punch)
| KOTC: Toryumon
| 
| align=center| 2
| align=center| 0:29
| Okinawa Prefecture, Japan
| 
|-
| Loss
| align=center| 24–14
| Eddie Alvarez
| Submission (rear-naked choke)
| Bellator 12
| 
| align=center| 2
| align=center| 0:38
| Hollywood, Florida, United States
| 
|-
| Win
| align=center| 24–13
| Jorge Masvidal
| Technical Submission (inverted triangle choke)
| Bellator 5
| 
| align=center| 3
| align=center| 3:22
| Dayton, Ohio, United States
| 
|-
| Win
| align=center| 23–13
| Alonzo Martinez
| Submission (rear-naked choke)
| Bellator 1
| 
| align=center| 1
| align=center| 3:26
| Hollywood, Florida, United States
| 
|-
| Win
| align=center| 22–13
| Jason Meaders
| TKO (corner stoppage)
| UnleashedFIGHT
| 
| align=center| 1
| align=center| 5:00
| Alpine, California, United States
| 
|-
| Win
| align=center| 21–13
| Shad Smith
| TKO (punches)
| Total Combat: Nevada
| 
| align=center| 1
| align=center| 2:25
| Laughlin, Nevada, United States
| 
|-
| Win
| align=center| 20–13
| Preston Scharf
| Submission (punches)
| Total Combat 26
| 
| align=center| 1
| align=center| 4:29
| San Diego, California, United States
| 
|-
| Win
| align=center| 19–13
| David Gardner
| Submission (rear-naked choke)
| Total Combat 22
| 
| align=center| 2
| align=center| N/A
| San Diego, California, United States
| 
|-
| Win
| align=center| 18–13
| Zach Light
| Submission (armbar)
| Total Combat 21
| 
| align=center| 1
| align=center| 2:35
| San Diego, California, United States
|Welterweight bout.
|-
| Win
| align=center| 17–13
| Randy Velarde
| Submission (armbar)
| KOTC: Caged Chaos
| 
| align=center| 2
| align=center| 2:23
| Laughlin, Nevada, United States
| 
|-
| Loss
| align=center| 16–13
| João Cunha
| Submission (armbar)
| Cage of Fire 5
| 
| align=center| 2
| align=center| 2:30
| Tijuana, Mexico
| 
|-
| Win
| align=center| 16–12
| Brandon Adamson
| TKO (cut)
| TC 18: Nightmare
| 
| align=center| 1
| align=center| 3:00
| San Diego, California, United States
| 
|-
| Win
| align=center| 15–12
| Danny Affleje
| KO (punches)
| Proving Ground
| 
| align=center| 1
| align=center| N/A
| Yuma, Arizona, United States
| 
|-
| Loss
| align=center| 14–12
| Tetsuji Kato
| TKO (punches)
| FFCF 6: Undisputed
| 
| align=center| 1
| align=center| 0:13
| Mangilao, Guam
| 
|-
| Loss
| align=center| 14–11
| Hermes França
| Submission (armbar)
| TC 14: Throwdown
| 
| align=center| 1
| align=center| 0:53
| Del Mar, California, United States
|Return to Lightweight.
|-
| Win
| align=center| 14–10
| Akbarh Arreola
| Decision (unanimous)
| Total Combat 12
| 
| align=center| 3
| align=center| 5:00
| Tijuana, Mexico
| 
|-
| Win
| align=center| 13–10
| Jerimiah Carson
| TKO (punches)
| Total Combat 11
| 
| align=center| 2
| align=center| N/A
| Yuma, Arizona, United States
| 
|-
| Loss
| align=center| 12–10
| Jake Shields
| Decision (unanimous)
| Kage Kombat
| 
| align=center| 3
| align=center| 5:00
| California, United States
| 
|-
| Win
| align=center| 12–9
| Tim Carey
| Submission (rear-naked choke)
| Total Combat 10
| 
| align=center| 1
| align=center| 2:25
| San Diego, California, United States
| 
|-
| Win
| align=center| 11–9
| Akbarh Arreola
| TKO (corner stoppage)
| Total Combat 9
| 
| align=center| 2
| align=center| 5:00
| Tijuana, Mexico
| 
|-
| Loss
| align=center| 10–9
| Cassio Werneck
| Submission (triangle choke)
| WEC 15
| 
| align=center| 2
| align=center| 2:54
| Lemoore, California, United States
|Return to Welterweight.
|-
| Loss
| align=center| 10–8
| Antonio McKee
| Decision (unanimous)
| Ultimate Cage Fighting 1
| 
| align=center| 2
| align=center| 5:00
| Los Angeles, California, United States
|Lightweight bout.
|-
| Loss
| align=center| 10–7
| Jason Miller
| Decision
| Xtreme Pankration 2
| 
| align=center| 2
| align=center| 5:00
| Los Angeles, California, United States
|
|-
| Loss
| align=center| 10–6
| Dennis Asche
| Submission (triangle choke)
| IFC: Warriors Challenge 12
| 
| align=center| 2
| align=center| 3:42
| Friant, California, United States
|Middleweight debut.
|-
| Loss
| align=center| 10–5
| Joe Stevenson
| Decision
| KOTC 3: Knockout Nightmare
| 
| align=center| 2
| align=center| 5:00
| San Jacinto, California, United States
|Lightweight bout.
|-
| Win
| align=center| 10–4
| Sean McCaan
| Submission (armbar)
| IFC: Warriors Challenge 6
| 
| align=center| 1
| align=center| 2:51
| Friant, California, United States
| 
|-
| Loss
| align=center| 9–4
| Dave Strasser
| Submission (armbar)
| Neutral Grounds 13
| 
| align=center| 1
| align=center| N/A
| Lakeside, California, United States
| 
|-
| Win
| align=center| 9–3
| David Harris
| Decision (unanimous)
| Neutral Grounds 13
| 
| align=center| 3
| align=center| 5:00
| Lakeside, California, United States
| 
|-
| Win
| align=center| 8–3
| Brennan Kamaka
| Submission (armbar)
| Rage in the Cage 2
| 
| align=center| 1
| align=center| 6:00
| Honolulu, Hawaii, United States
|Lightweight bout.
|-
| Win
| align=center| 7–3
| Ken Tonaria
| Submission (armbar)
| Ready to Rumble
| 
| align=center| N/A
| align=center| N/A
| Woodland Hills, California, United States
|
|-
| Loss
| align=center| 6–3
| Steve Heath
| Decision (unanimous)
| Extreme Challenge 27
| 
| align=center| 2
| align=center| 5:00
| Fresno, California, United States
|Light Heavyweight debut.
|-
| Loss
| align=center| 6–2
| Adrian Serrano
| TKO (corner stoppage)
| Extreme Challenge 27
| 
| align=center| 2
| align=center| 5:00
| Davenport, Iowa, United States
|Welterweight debut.
|-
| Win
| align=center| 6–1
| Jason Von Flue
| Submission (armbar)
| IFC: Warriors Challenge 4
| 
| align=center| 2
| align=center| 5:08
| Jackson, California, United States
| 
|-
| Win
| align=center| 5–1
| Johnny Molano
| Submission (triangle armbar)
| Kage Kombat 18
| 
| align=center| 1
| align=center| 4:03
| United States
| 
|-
| Win
| align=center| 4–1
| Thiago De Fritas
| Submission (heel hook)
| Neutral Grounds 12
| 
| align=center| 1
| align=center| N/A
| United States
| 
|-
| Win
| align=center| 3–1
| Giovanni Lemm
| Submission (armbar)
| Neutral Grounds 11
| 
| align=center| 1
| align=center| 5:01
| Los Angeles, California, United States
| 
|-
| Win
| align=center| 2–1
| Ken Kellenberger
| Submission (rear-naked choke)
| Neutral Grounds 9
| 
| align=center| 1
| align=center| 0:45
| United States
| 
|-
| Loss
| align=center| 1–1
| Jason Dallas
| TKO (punches)
| Neutral Grounds 6
| 
| align=center| 1
| align=center| N/A
| United States
| 
|-
| Win
| align=center| 1–0
| Lee Cox
| Submission (armbar)
| Neutral Grounds 6
| 
| align=center| 1
| align=center| N/A
| United States
|

Kickboxing and shootboxing record

Submission grappling record
KO PUNCHES
|- style="text-align:center; background:#f0f0f0;"
| style="border-style:none none solid solid; "|Result
| style="border-style:none none solid solid; "|Opponent
| style="border-style:none none solid solid; "|Method
| style="border-style:none none solid solid; "|Event
| style="border-style:none none solid solid; "|Date
| style="border-style:none none solid solid; "|Round
| style="border-style:none none solid solid; "|Time
| style="border-style:none none solid solid; "|Notes
|-
|Loss||  Ricardo Morais || Choke || 1998 ADCC World Championships|| March 20, 1998 || 1  || 9:22 ||
|-
|Loss||  Karimula Barkalaev || Choke || 1998 ADCC World Championships|| March 20, 1998|| 1  || 3:05 ||
|-
|Win||  Lafee Al Ajloony || Shoulder Injury || 1998 ADCC World Championships|| March 20, 1998|| 1 || 3:46 ||
|-

References

External links

1979 births
Living people
American male mixed martial artists
Mixed martial artists from California
Lightweight mixed martial artists
Mixed martial artists utilizing shootboxing
Mixed martial artists utilizing judo
Mixed martial artists utilizing jujutsu
American male kickboxers
Kickboxers from California
Welterweight kickboxers
American male judoka
American jujutsuka
Sportspeople from Chula Vista, California
American sportspeople of Japanese descent
American sportspeople of Mexican descent